Danielle Grega (born July 2, 1996) is an American field hockey player. Grega was named to the U.S Women's National Team in 2018.

Personal life
Grega was born in Kingston, Pennsylvania. She began playing hockey in her sixth year at school.

Career

Senior National Team
Grega made her senior international debut in 2018 during a test series against Belgium.

Grega has been a regular inclusion in the United States team since her debut, most recently appearing in the 2019 FIH Pro League.

International Goals

References

1996 births
Living people
American female field hockey players
Pan American Games bronze medalists for the United States
Pan American Games medalists in field hockey
Field hockey players at the 2019 Pan American Games
Sportspeople from Pennsylvania
Medalists at the 2019 Pan American Games
21st-century American women